"Rockaria!" is a song by Electric Light Orchestra (ELO), written by Jeff Lynne. It was the third track on the band's successful 1976 album A New World Record, and was the second single from the album. On some CD pressings of A New World Record, the title appears without the exclamation mark.

Recording
The operatic voice of Mary Thomas is featured on the track, particularly during the introduction. On the first take of the song, Thomas mistakenly began the vocal too early. However, Lynne elected to use that take, complete with her interjection, "Oops!", although the interjection is omitted from some later pressings of the album.

Released as a single in 1977, it reached the Top Ten in the UK Singles Chart. AllMusic noted that the track "is rightly considered to be one of Jeff Lynne's finest achievements on record".

B-side
"Poker" is a song written and performed by Electric Light Orchestra.

The song first appeared on the band's LP Face the Music as the fifth track. At 3:34, it is the shortest song on the album. During recording, Kelly Groucutt sang most of the song's lyrics (generally, Jeff Lynne sang the vocals of ELO songs).

The song twice appeared as a B-side, first of "Rockaria!" in the UK, then in 1979 as the flip side of the US single version of "Confusion".

"Poker rocks along with murderous intent, despite corn ball lyrics." – John Ingham (1975 – from a transcribed UK Face the Music album review of unknown origin)

Chart positions

Weekly charts

Year-end charts

Jeff Lynne version
Jeff Lynne re-recorded the song in his own home studio. It was released on a compilation album with other re-recorded ELO songs, under the ELO name, as an iTunes Store exclusive bonus track.

References

1976 songs
1977 singles
Electric Light Orchestra songs
Jet Records singles
Song recordings produced by Jeff Lynne
Songs written by Jeff Lynne